Judge Baldwin may refer to:

Alexander W. Baldwin (1835–1869), judge of the United States District Court for the District of Nevada
James H. Baldwin (1876–1944), judge of the United States District Court for the District of Montana
Phillip Baldwin (1924–2002), judge of the United States Court of Appeals for the Federal Circuit

See also
Justice Baldwin (disambiguation)